Tineovertex is a genus of moths belonging to the family Tineidae.

Species
Tineovertex contains the following species:

 Tineovertex antidroma (Meyrick, 1931)
 Tineovertex canicoma (Meyrick, 1911)
 Tineovertex elongata Huang, Hirowatari & Wang, 2011
 Tineovertex expansa Huang, Hirowatari & Wang, 2011
 Tineovertex fibriformis Huang, Hirowatari & Wang, 2011
 Tineovertex flavilineata 
 Tineovertex gladiata Huang, Hirowatari & Wang, 2007
 Tineovertex hamoides Huang, Hirowatari, Wang, 2011
 Tineovertex melanochrysa (Meyrick, 1911)
 Tineovertex melliflua (Meyrick, 1911)
 Tineovertex sartoria (Meyrick, 1911)
 Tineovertex thailandia Huang, Hirowatari & Wang, 2011

References

Myrmecozelinae
Tineidae genera